The LaPerm is a breed of cat. A LaPerm's fur is curly (hence the name "perm"), with the tightest curls being on the throat and on the base of the ears. LaPerms come in many colors and patterns. LaPerms generally have a very affectionate personality.

Breed profile

The LaPerm is a rex breed which originated in the United States and is now present in many other countries worldwide. The breed is genetically unique and not related to any other rex cat varieties, having a dominant gene causing their curly coats. They have an elegant and athletic build and are affectionate, active, and outgoing in character. They are reputed to be hypoallergenic cats, provoking a significantly lower level of an allergic response in humans than normal cats. Their most significant feature is their coat, which is made up of soft waves, curls, and ringlets, resembling a shaggy perm.

History
The LaPerm emerged around the early 1980s as a spontaneous mutation of cats bred for pest control. The breed founders were Linda and Richard Koehl from The Dalles, Oregon, whose cat Speedy gave birth to a curly-coated kitten, named Curly, from whom all LaPerms descend. The Kohls allowed a free-breeding colony of curly-coated cats to develop over a period of ten years before making contact with members of the cat fancy and initiating a formal breeding program.
The breed was named after their curly coat which bears resemblance to a shaggy perm.

Description
The LaPerm is in many ways a cat of moderation with no extremes and is still true to its original type. It does however have an unusual coat. The breed standard describes a muscular foreign-type body, which is medium in size with longish legs and neck. The head is a modified wedge with rounded contours and a muzzle which is slightly broad of the wedge. In profile, the straight nose leads into a break between the eyes up to a flattish forehead. LaPerms also have rather broad noses, flared ears, and medium-large almond-shaped eyes.

Like other rexes, all colors and patterns are acceptable, although tabbies, reds and torties are quite common due to their origins. Also, the unusual colors from the early days of the breed have been selected for, so lilac, chocolate and colorpoints are popular. Newer varieties such as ticked tabbies, shades and darker points are also being bred.

The coat itself is described as having a textured feel. It is not silky, having a certain drag on the hand like mohair. It is usually soft, although the shorthairs will have more texture to their coats. The coat is loose and springy and stands away from the body with no thick undercoat. It is light and airy and judges sometimes blow on the coat to see if it will part. The coat varies according to the season and the maturity of the cat but is essentially wavy or curly with the longest and most defined curls in the ruff and on the neck. There is also longer curly fur inside the ears, tufts at the ear tips and "ear muffs", or longer, silky hair on the backs of the ears. The longhairs have a curly plumed tail while the shorthairs have tails rather like bottle brushes, and both have long curled whiskers. The coat sometimes falls into a natural parting along the back.

United States 
The first LaPerms were those belonging to breed founders Linda and Dick Koehl at their farm in Oregon. The other breeders who joined Linda to work on the breed's initial development in the USA included Solveig Pfleuger (Manawyddan), who was a well-respected feline geneticist, Anne D Lawrence (Uluru), Beth Fillman (Calicorose) and Dee Borgardt (Deebor and Dairyland). Still, during the early days of the breeding program, they were joined by other breeders, including Pete Meisinger & Donna Lawry (Woodlandacre and Hattkatts), Maureen Neidhardt (Lakotaspirit), Lynne Daggett (Lowriders) and Mary Sharum (Sekani). The LaPerm Society of America (LPSA) was formed in 1997 and became affiliated to CFA, helping to push the breed forward in that organization.

Valued members of the LPSA who have contributed to the breed's development and whose prefixes are seen in key LaPerm pedigrees include Erika Fetz (Vankkadia), Cheryl Cook (PacificGem) Diane Dunn (Lakme), Andrea Brew (Moonrise), Sandy Brew (Sunfall), Dennis Ganoe (Dennigan) and Debbie Estep (Shoalwater). When TICA finally approved championship status for the LaPerm in 2003 the all-important first cat to become a champion was Ch Dennigan's French Maid of Shoalwater, bred by Dennis Ganoe and owned by Debbie Estep. The breed gained championship recognition in CFA in May 2008 and the first champion was Ch Sunfall's BC Kahaha Towanjila. The first grand was Grand Premier Uluru BC Cloudfeet of CavalierCats owned by Cathy Hurley.

United Kingdom
The first LaPerm in the UK was Champion Uluru BC Omaste Po of Quincunx, a lilac tortie and white Longhair who was bred in the United States by A. D. Lawrence and Maureen Neidhardt. She was imported by Anthony Nichols (Quincunx) using a PETS pet passport in May 2002 after a stop-over with LaPerm breeder Corine Judkins in the Netherlands. She arrived pregnantly and gave birth to a litter of five kittens shortly after who were used as the foundation stock for the UK breeding program. A number of other imports followed, including cats from Europe, New Zealand, and the USA. Judy Whiteford (Aswani) and Kate Munslow (Canonna) have been involved from that first litter and have both imported new cats themselves and Corine Judkins (Crearwy) moved to Wales bringing her cats with her including the stud who sired the first UK litter. Other key breeding lines found in UK pedigrees include those of Edwina Sipos (Cicada), Penni Cragg (Wakanda), June Gillies (Gallego), Kate Ekanger (Cloudborn), Sue Amor (Amorcatz) and Sue Pyrke (Bane). The breeding program has been characterized by efforts to breed down from outcrosses for generational advancement by combining outcross lines, old lines, and import lines.

The UK now has an active LaPerm breeding program and is the home of the LaPerm Cat Club. The breed has made solid progress within the GCCF and is often seen at British cat shows. In 2004 the breed gained Preliminary Recognition and the LaPerm Cat Club was formed. In June 2008, the LaPerm gained Provisional Recognition in the GCCF and the first cat to gain an Intermediate Certificate was Aswani Miranda Keys. In June 2012, the LaPerm gained full championship recognition with the GCCF and the first certificate winner was also Aswani Miranda Keys. The first LaPerm to become a GCCF champion was a female, Ballego Happy-Gladys, who went on to also become the first Grand Champion, and the first LaPerm to become a GCCF premier was Pr Wakanda Harriet Potter. The first male champion was Ch Quincunx Umberto Ecarl. The first LaPerm with an Imperial title was also Aswani Miranda Keys, the title being gained at the world's first LaPerm breed show, which was held by the LaPerm Cat Club. The first male LaPerm with an imperial title was Imperial Grand Premier Cloudborn Barb Dwyer, bred by Kate Ekanger and owned by Nicola and Roy Lovell.

Around the world
Breeding programs for LaPerms have spread to many other countries around the world. The breed was brought to Canada by Constance & Martine Sansoucy (Butterpaws), to New Zealand by Twink McCabe (Coiffurr) and Glynne Jackson (Wakijaki), to Australia by Christine Brelsford (Curlz) and later by Anne-Louise Magee (Frisson), to South Africa by Johan Lamprecht (Les Beaux Chats) and later by Grant Leih (Silkenclaw). LaPerms are also present in Japan, having first being exported there in 1997 by Anne D Lawrence. In continental Europe the first LaPerms were imported to Germany by Sabine Albrecht (Isanyati), these included the first LaPerm champion, Ch Uluru BC Wiyaka. However, it was Sylvie Groenveld (Smeralda's) who led the breeding program in that country. The initial imports to the Netherlands went to Corine Judkins (Crearwy) and a breed club was set up: the LaPerm Raskatten Vereniging, with key prefixes belonging to Frank and Rina Stapel (Taricats), Karin Langeveld (Takoda) and Angela Bruynswyck (Brunswick's).

The first Scandinavian breeder was Elinore Kopp (Shangri-La) in Sweden who imported Grand Champion Quincunx Qinkifurr and Champion Crearwy BC Madryn Merch Cari from the UK. The first Russian breeder was Svetlana Ponomareva (Russicurl). The first LaPerm in Taiwan was Triple Tiara Newron, bred by Yumi Masuda and imported from Japan by Archi Wang. Several other countries now also have LaPerms and the breed's popularity continues to spread. Provisional recognition was granted by FIFe in 2013, effective from 1 January 2014, which the first titled LaPerm in FIFe being Champion S*Bla Katten KombiSmart.

Breeding policies
Breeding policies vary slightly between registries, but all encourage the occasional use of controlled outcrossing to maintain healthy genetic diversity within the breed's gene pool. A small range of pedigree breeds have been approved, as well as non-pedigree domestic cats. When undertaking outcross matings to non-pedigrees, reputable breeders seek out cats closely resembling the correct LaPerm body type with coats that are not overly thick. This practice continues the use of the kind of cats which composed much of the original foundation stock for the breed and helps to maintain genetic health by using the widest gene pool available. However, in some countries, such as the UK, there can be legal complications to selling kittens from such matings as pedigrees because of the Trades Description Act 1968 through which it has been established that the legal definition of a pedigree cat in the UK is normally one with a fully recorded three-generation pedigree. After outcrossing to a cat of unknown parentage, at least three generations must be bred to establish a full pedigree record.

In TICA outcrossing has mainly been with the domestic short-haired cat and domestic long-haired cat, although registration rules do allow other breeds to be used and bred down from towards the F3 generation which is eligible for entry in TICA cat shows.

In Cat Fanciers' Association (CFA) breeders used the Ocicat for a two-year period, terminating on 1 May 2002; LaPerms registered during this period were permitted to have an Ocicat parent, and by extension, one or two Abyssinian grandparents, as the Abyssinian is an approved outcross of the Ocicat. Currently, CFA breeders may only use non-pedigree domestic cats and after 2025 no outcrosses will be permitted in CFA. However, CFA accepts LaPerms for both breedings and showing with other breeds in their pedigrees if they are imported from another registry.

The GCCF has the most strict of the registration policies and only LaPerms with a full three-generation pedigree (i.e. parents, grandparents, and great-grandparents) of the only LaPerm to LaPerm breeding are permitted on the full register. Only LaPerms or cats from a list of approved breeds are permitted in the 4th and 5th generations. Cats with non-approved breeds anywhere within their five-generation pedigrees, particularly those with other rex genes, cannot be registered as LaPerms. In order not to cause any damaging restriction to the breed's genepool a supplementary register also exists for the registration of LaPerms bred as part of an outcross breeding program. LaPerms can only be registered on the supplementary register if within their five-generation pedigrees only LaPerms and cats from the approved outcross list are present. In the GCCF this list comprises the Somali/Abyssinian, Asian/Tiffanie/(European)Burmese, Ocicat and Tonkinese. Domestic Shorthairs and Domestic Longhairs can be used in outcrossing but certain restrictions apply and the initial offspring are placed on the reference register and cannot be shown without first being assessed and approved by three judges. In other registries the approved list (with some slight variations) is used for outcrossing and cats of unknown parentage are not always permitted.

In FIFe, which has its most active LaPerm breeders in Sweden and the Netherlands, outcrossing is done on a case by case basis. In antipodean countries, Somalis, Tiffanies and Orientals have also been used, but Domestic Shorthairs and Domestic Longhairs are now the preferred choices of an outcross.

Gallery

References

Sources
Morris, Desmond. 1996. Cat World: A Feline Encyclopaedia
Lawrence, A.D. 2000. The LaPerm Cat: The New Wave In Cats For The Millennium.
Helgren, J. Anne. 2001. Rex Cats.
Various. 2007. LaPerm Cats, The Cat To Curl Up With.

Cat breeds
Rex cat breeds
Cat breeds originating in the United States